"Force of Life" is the ninth episode of the first series of Space: 1999. The screenplay was written by Johnny Byrne; the director was David Tomblin.  The original title was "Force of Evil".  The shooting script is dated 15 May 1974; the final shooting script is dated 24 May 1974.  Live-action filming began Wednesday 29 May 1974 through Friday 7 June 1974.  After a three-week hiatus, filming resumed Monday 1 July 1974 through Friday 5 July 1974; the hiatus was planned, as the Landaus' contract guaranteed them time off for a summer holiday.

Story 
The body of Anton Zoref is invaded by an unknown life-force. The man soon manifests an uncontrollable ability to absorb heat. As the Alphans struggle to understand this mysterious force, Zoref's need becomes insatiable. Driven by instinct, he freezes Mark Dominix, Hilary Preston and the security guard dead until he makes his way to the greatest source of heat on Alpha— one of its Nuclear Generating Plants.  As Zoref himself is killed by a hand laser to prevent him from attacking Commander Koenig, the laser only strengthens the starving force long enough to enable it to enter on of Alpha's reactor cores and feed off of the power of the nuclear energy generating plant.  This causes a massive explosion. The force leaves Moonbase Alpha and Eva, Anton's wife, grieves as she thinks about her life with Zoref.

Cast

Starring 
 Martin Landau — Commander John Koenig
 Barbara Bain — Doctor Helena Russell

Also Starring 
 Barry Morse — Professor Victor Bergman

Guest Star 
 Ian McShane — Anton Zoref

Guest Artist 
 Gay Hamilton — Eva Zoref

Featuring 
 Prentis Hancock — Controller Paul Morrow
 Clifton Jones — David Kano
 Zienia Merton — Sandra Benes
 Anton Phillips — Doctor Bob Mathias
 Nick Tate — Captain Alan Carter
 John Hamill — Mark Dominix
 Eva Rueber-Staier — Jane

Uncredited Artists 
 Suzanne Roquette — Tanya
 Lea Dregorn — Hilary Preston
 Tony Allyn — Security Guard
 Sarah Bullen — Kate
 Barbara Kelly — Computer Voice

Music 
To highlight the utterly alien nature of the unknown life-force, the regular Barry Gray score was replaced by abstract electronic compositions drawn from the music library.  Those featured were 'Cosmic Sounds No. 1', 'Cosmic Sounds No. 2' and 'Cosmic Sounds No. 3' by Georges Teperino and 'Videotronic No. 3' by Cecil Leuter.  Another synthesised music track, 'The Latest Fashion' by Giampiero Boneschi, was used as the piped music heard throughout the Solarium scenes.

Production Notes 
 Johnny Byrne recalls that the original story idea featured a malevolent alien force (hence the previous title "Force of Evil").  During a story conference with executive producer Gerry Anderson, Byrne rethought the concept, with both men agreeing the entity should instead be following an evolutionary imperative unconnected to human emotion or understanding.  To emphasise the truly alien aspect of the life-force, Bryne set the action against the very human domestic life of Anton and Eva Zoref.  ITC executives insisted Byrne add the sequence where Koenig and Bergman speculate the entity's evolutionary cycle might be that of a developing star, hoping to provide some explanation for its actions.
 Byrne attributes the episode's success to the directorial style of David Tomblin.  Tomblin would employ a number of unusual camera-angles and lens techniques to enhance the eerie quality inherent in the tale.  After completing "Force of Life", Tomblin (one of three directors employed by the series on a rotating basis along with Ray Austin and Charles Crichton), would take a sabbatical from Space: 1999 to serve as assistant director for the feature film Barry Lyndon.  He would be replaced for three installments by director Bob Kellett.
 This episode was taken to task by critics who accused Space: 1999 of being poorly plotted and/or deliberately enigmatic.  While appearing on an American news programme, Martin Landau was confronted by a fellow guest personality, actor Buster Crabbe (star of the 1930s Flash Gordon and Buck Rogers serials).  Having watched "Force of Life" and not understood the story, Crabbe demanded Landau explain what the alien force represented; to the delight of the series' detractors, Landau responded he had no idea.

Novelisation 
The episode was adapted in the third Year One Space: 1999 novel The Space Guardians by Brian Ball, published in 1975.  Ball's adaptation is true to the story, but some liberties are taken:  (1) Suffering from a bout of depression, Koenig has become a recluse after his experience on Zenno (as seen in "Missing Link").  He is seen convalescing in his quarters and experiencing migraine when thinking of his lost love Vana.  This crisis eventually forces him out of his fugue state; (2) The approaching entity does not employ a paralysing force in the adaptation.  The Alphans attempt to blast it with nuclear missiles before it joins with the unfortunate Zoref; (3) While harbouring the entity, Zoref undergoes a gradual physical transformation into a shambling, thick-skulled humanoid creature.

References

External links 
Space: 1999 - "Force of Life" - The Catacombs episode guide
Space: 1999 - "Force of Life" - Moonbase Alpha's Space: 1999 page

1975 British television episodes
Space: 1999 episodes